The Ilek Formation is a Lower Cretaceous geologic formation in Western Siberia. Many different fossils have been recovered from the formation. It overlies the Late Jurassic Tyazhin Formation and underlies the Albian Kiya Formation.

The formation was described by L. A. Ragozin in 1935. It consists of sands with sandstone concretions, layers of silts, clays and marls. Age of the formation, according to a crude 1962 estimate, is Valanginian(?) - Hauterivian - Barremian. Its thickness varies greatly, reaching 746 m in Teguldet borehole.

Fauna 

A fragmentary wing metatarsal nearly identical to the pterosaur Lonchognathosaurus is also known.

See also 
 List of pterosaur-bearing stratigraphic units

References

Geologic formations of Russia
Lower Cretaceous Series of Asia
Cretaceous Russia
Shale formations
Siltstone formations
Paleontology in Russia
Geology of Siberia